A list of films produced in Pakistan in 1959 (see 1959 in film) and in the Urdu language:

1959

See also
 1959 in Pakistan

References

External links
 Search Pakistani film - IMDB.com

1959
Pakistani
Films